Eutelsat 8 West B is a geostationary communications satellite. Operated by Eutelsat, it provides direct-to-home (DTH) broadcasting services from geostationary orbit. The satellite is part of Eutelsat's constellation at a longitude of 13° East. Eutelsat announced the order of a new Spacebus-4000C3 satellite bus from Thales Alenia Space in October 2012.

Satellite description 
Eutelsat 8 West B is a  satellite with a design life of 15 years. It is equipped with an S400-12 apogee motor which was used for initial orbit-raising manoeuvres and an S10-18 engine for station keeping burns. The spacecraft has 10 C-band and 40 Ku-band transponders.

Launch 
Eutelsat 8 West B was launched on the Ariane 5ECA launch vehicles from Centre Spatial Guyanais at the Kourou in French Guiana. Liftoff occurred at 20:34:08 UTC on 20 August 2015, with the launch vehicle successfully injecting its payload into geosynchronous transfer orbit (GTO). The launch was conducted by Arianespace.

Mission 
Following launch, the satellite Eutelsat 8 West B used its apogee motor to raise itself into geostationary orbit, positioning itself at a longitude of 13° East. Capacity leased by Nilesat is marketed as Nilesat 104B.

References

External links 
 
 Information about this satellite

Spacecraft launched in 2015
Ariane commercial payloads
Satellites using the Spacebus bus
Eutelsat satellites
Communications satellites in geostationary orbit